Erica Page White (September 17, 1975) is an American actress, known for her role as Roseanne Delgado on the ABC daytime soap opera One Life to Live from 1998 to 2001. In 2000, she received ALMA Award for Outstanding Actress in a Daytime Drama.

Page, who was adopted as an infant, was born and raised in Dallas, Texas. She made her acting debut appearing in the 1994 television film Without Consent starring Jennie Garth and Jill Eikenberry. From 1996 to 1997, she starred in the ABC drama series, Second Noah and later made her film debut appearing in Little Bigfoot (1997) and its sequel Little Bigfoot 2: The Journey Home (1998). From 2001 to 2002, she had a recurring role in the Showtime drama series Resurrection Blvd., and in 2008 played Dr. Amber Kress in the NBC soap opera Days of Our Lives. In 2014, she guest-starred in the TNT prime time soap opera Dallas, and starred in the reality series Private Lives of Nashville Wives.

Personal life
Page married country music singer Bryan White in 2000. The couple have two sons, Justin and Jackson.

Filmography

References

External links

American soap opera actresses
Actresses from Dallas
American television actresses
1975 births
Living people
21st-century American women